Citizenship Aesthetics is a movement set forth by Council for Cultural Affairs of the Republic of China that proposes an aesthetic style of practicing citizenship. Citizenship aesthetians believe that an aesthetic style of citizenship can help set up the best of our world. 

Citizenship aesthetics-based world is a world built on the model of citizenship aesthetics. A world such built would not reduce all worldly entities into resource materials, waiting for people to measure, manipulate and manufacture into products as to meet personal needs or wants. Instead, a world built on the model  would break the modern technology enframing fate, and emancipate all enframed worldly entities as they essentially are, and set forth a holistic union space for them to poetically dwell and freely encounter with each other.

Aesthetic citizens are people that are engaged with the world in the aesthetic kind of ways—namely, existing, living, acting in the world, wherein all beings-in the world, worldly entities, natural as well as man-made, can show themselves truthly and encounter each other harmoniously as they are.

According to Political philosopher, Hannah Arendt, politics is the noblest art for the realization of immortality. Politics is not necessarily ugly and deceitful tricks. For example, enacting citizenship aesthetics movement, citizen participation, such as general election, could be turned into some sort of citizenship art making, aiming to create beautiful world for and in itself. Candidates and voters together construct the beautiful vision for citizen autonomous governance through sober reason, rich affections, as well as graceful artistic techniques. Putting behind us the harmful shadow cast over by the notorious election practices, we can reaffirm each other the wisdom and concern, light up again the real passion of full trust. We will believe again elections are opportunities for showing our love and concern about our homeland.

Citizenship aesthetics-inspired elections, which are modelled on citizenship aesthetics, would grand us promise to invite all being-in-the-world, local or global, past, present and future, all residents (including human, nature, devine, spirits and so on) come together hand in hand to bring out each other's best and set forth the happiest and richest well-being for all. 

The young generation does not need to feel pushed off as to give up altogether the inalienable opportunities to take part in the noblest human endeavor, that is to participate in politics with the goal of pursuing immortality.  They are entitled to have more up-to-dated new century kind of election, such as on-line election.  On-line voting mechanism with friendly accessibility, would help break the traditional election's time-consuming and resource-wasting patterns.

On-line elections would also help break the candidate-centered myth.  With that myth bygone, no longer would the electorate have to passively put up with the candidate's unidirectional brainwash.  Thanks to on-line election system integrating with all sorts of citizenship participation schemes, for example, real time referendum, voting, recalling, interactive public forum and so oneveryone can voice his or her opinions as much as he or she like. 

With citizenship aesthetics-based election campaign, people can face up freshly to the real post-colonialism world realities, and say goodbye for good to all kinds of centralized viewpoints transmitted by colonists of whatever bloods.  People are free to unearth the grace and the sublime of local worlds.

People are invited to reach out for real lifeworld realities of multiple cultures and go beyond transcendence to make true of holistic union.  No longer are candidates or star campaigners able to monopolize campaign stage and to manipulate voters.

In the citizen forum, human and nature, individual and community,  reality and ideal, sentiment and reason, all are perfectly in  harmony.  Works of election arts unfold natural and clear, inspiring, navigating, solidifying, and pulling altogether wisdoms and feelings, open up the life-world unity of alethia (un-concealment or truth), which commemorates, inherits, initiates, and unconceals the world of purity on this earth, an immortal life-world of the true, the good and the beautiful.

In brief, the citizenship aesthetics-based election should release multiple modes of creativity, and say goodbye to the out-of-dated ugly election campaign culture.

Society of Taiwan